The 2015 Hockey East Men's Ice Hockey Tournament was played between March 6 and March 21, 2015 at campus locations and at the TD Garden in Boston, Massachusetts. The Boston University Terriers defeated the UMass Lowell River Hawks by a score of 5–3 to earn their 8th Hockey East championship in school history and earn Hockey East's automatic bid into the 2015 NCAA Division I Men's Ice Hockey Tournament. Jack Eichel was named tournament MVP.

The tournament is the 31st in league history.

Format
With the addition of the UConn Huskies to Hockey East, the tournament was reformatted to include all twelve teams in the conference. Seeds 1–4 earned a first-round bye, and seeds 5–12 played a best-of-three Opening Round played on campus locations. Winners advanced to play the 1–4 seeds in the best-of-three Quarterfinals on campus locations. Winners of those series played in a single-game Semifinal, and those winners faced off in a single-game Championship Final, both at the TD Garden.

Regular season standings
Note: GP = Games played; W = Wins; L = Losses; T = Ties; PTS = Points; GF = Goals For; GA = Goals Against

Bracket
Teams are reseeded after the Opening Round and Quarterfinals

Note: * denotes overtime period(s)

Results

Opening Round

(5) Notre Dame vs. (12) Massachusetts

(6) Northeastern vs. (11) Merrimack

(7) Vermont vs. (10) Maine

(8) New Hampshire vs. (9) Connecticut

Quarterfinals

(1) Boston University vs. (11) Merrimack

(2) Providence vs. (8) New Hampshire

(3) Boston College vs. (7) Vermont

(4) Massachusetts–Lowell vs. (5) Notre Dame

Semifinals

(1) Boston University vs. (8) New Hampshire

(4) Massachusetts–Lowell vs. (7) Vermont

Championship

(1) Boston University vs. (4) Massachusetts–Lowell

Tournament awards

All-Tournament Team
F Jack Eichel* (Boston University)
F Grayson Downing (New Hampshire)
F Evan Rodrigues (Boston University)
D Matt Grzelcyk (Boston University)
D Robbie Russo (Notre Dame)
G Matt O'Connor (Boston University)

* Tournament MVP(s)

References

External links
2015 Hockey East Men's Ice Hockey Tournament

Hockey East Men's Ice Hockey Tournament
Hockey East Men's Ice Hockey Tournament